Jean-Marc Ferratge (born 10 October 1959 in Cazères) is a retired professional French footballer who played striker.

Born in Cazères, Ferratge began playing professional football with FC Girondins de Bordeaux. He played in Ligue 1 for Bordeaux, Nîmes Olympique, Toulouse FC and AS Monaco FC, winning the league with Monaco in 1987.

References

External links
Profile on French federation official site

1959 births
Living people
French footballers
France international footballers
Association football forwards
FC Girondins de Bordeaux players
Nîmes Olympique players
Toulouse FC players
AS Monaco FC players
Ligue 1 players
Ligue 2 players
French football managers
Pau FC managers